Morvilliers is the name of several communes in France:

 Morvilliers, Aube in the Aube department
 Morvilliers, Eure-et-Loir, in the Eure-et-Loir department